Manbareh is a village in Nosratabad Rural District, in the Central District of Alborz County, Qazvin Province, Iran. At the 2006 census, its population was 86, in 20 families.

References 

Populated places in Alborz County